Halda River is a river in south-eastern Bangladesh. It originates at the Badnatali Hill Ranges in Ramgarh Upazila in the Chittagong Hill Tracts, flows through Fatikchhari Upazila, Bhujpur Thana, Hathazari Upazila, Raozan Upazila and Chandgaon Thana of the Chittagong Metropolitan City, and falls into the Karnaphuli River. The river is navigable by big boats  from its mouth up to Nazir Hat, and by small boats  further up to Narayanhat.

The Halda river is also famous for breeding pure Indian carp. This is the only pure Indian carp breeding field of Bangladesh, perhaps in South Asia.

See also
List of rivers in Bangladesh

References

Rivers of Bangladesh
Rivers of Chittagong Division